Robert William Jones  (16 December 1932 – 28 May 1997) was a 20th-century American composer.

Life 
Robert W. Jones was born in Oak Park, Illinois. He studied at University of Redlands, University of Minnesota and at the American Conservatory of Music in Chicago. He was a student of Wayne Bohrnstedt.

From 1965 to 1969 he taught at public schools in West Hartford, thereafter at Schoolcraft College in Livonia, Michigan and at the University of Minnesota.

Works (selection) 
 Sonata for Worship No 2 (Prelude; Offertory; Postlude), Shawnee HF-32
 Sonata for Worship No 3 (Preamble; Echo Fantasy; Recessional), Shawnee HF-34
 Sonata for Worship No 6 (Introit; Invocation and Dance; Meditation; 1971), org/electronic tape, Flammer HF-5067
 "St. Denio": a Toccata for Organ, Sacred Music Press/Boosey & Hawkes

References

External links 
 
 musicainfo.net

Notes 

20th-century classical composers
American composers
University of Minnesota faculty
1932 births
1997 deaths